Arthur William Smith (born May 27, 1982) is an American football coach who is the head coach for the Atlanta Falcons of the National Football League (NFL). Smith previously served as an assistant coach for the Tennessee Titans, most recently as an offensive coordinator, prior to becoming head coach of the Falcons in 2021.

Early years and playing career
Smith was born in Memphis, Tennessee, on May 27, 1982. He attended Georgetown Preparatory School in North Bethesda, Maryland, where he played on the offensive line and was team captain. He also saw some action at defensive tackle. Smith also participated in track, lacrosse, and basketball. In his high school career, Smith was a first-team all-state selection at offensive line, two-time all-conference, and first-team All-Metro by The Washington Post.

Smith was a guard for North Carolina from 2001 to 2005. He was a redshirt freshman in 2001. Smith only played in a single game for the 2002 season as he was diagnosed with a foot problem and did not play the remainder of the season. Smith had foot surgery in January 2003 and missed the entire 2003 season. Smith saw little action in 2004 and in 2005. After graduating in 2006, Smith became a graduate assistant for North Carolina.

Coaching career

Early career
Smith began his NFL coaching career in 2007, when he became the defensive quality control coach for the Washington Redskins. He would stay at that position through 2008. In 2010, Smith was hired as a defensive intern and administrative assistant for Ole Miss.

Tennessee Titans

Smith was hired to become the defensive quality control coach for the Tennessee Titans in 2011 under new head coach Mike Munchak. Smith then became the offensive quality coach for the 2012 season. He was promoted to the assistant offensive line and assistant tight ends coach in 2013. Munchak was fired after the 2013 season and new head coach Ken Whisenhunt retained Smith as the assistant tight ends coach. Mid-way through the 2015 season, Whisenhunt was fired and replaced by tight ends coach Mike Mularkey. Mularkey was kept as head coach for the 2016 season and so was Smith as the new tight ends coach. When Mularkey was fired after the 2017 season, new head coach Mike Vrabel kept Smith as the tight ends coach for 2018.

On January 21, 2019, Smith was promoted to offensive coordinator, replacing Matt LaFleur, who departed to become head coach of the Green Bay Packers two weeks prior. In his first year as offensive coordinator, Smith oversaw the highest-scoring Titans team in 16 years, with Derrick Henry, Ryan Tannehill, and Jonnu Smith having career years. Smith was praised for his play-calling in the Titans' 28-12 win over the top-seeded Baltimore Ravens in the AFC Divisional Round.

Atlanta Falcons
On January 15, 2021, Smith was hired to become the head coach of the Atlanta Falcons.

2021 season

On September 12, 2021, Smith lost in his head coaching debut against the Philadelphia Eagles by a score of 6–32. On September 26, 2021, Smith received his first career win as a head coach in a 17–14 victory over the New York Giants. On January 9, 2022, Smith and the Falcons lost to the New Orleans Saints in the final game of the season by a score of 20–30, ending the season with a 7–10 record. The Falcons finished 3rd in the NFC South and did not qualify for the playoffs.

Head coaching record

Personal life
Smith and his wife, Allison, reside in Atlanta, Georgia, with their three children, Tanner, Sophie, and William. Smith's father is FedEx founder and former CEO Frederick W. Smith. He has nine siblings, including sisters Windland Smith Rice and Molly Smith.

References

External links
 Atlanta Falcons bio
 North Carolina bio

Living people
1982 births
American football offensive guards
National Football League offensive coordinators
North Carolina Tar Heels football coaches
North Carolina Tar Heels football players
Ole Miss Rebels football coaches
Players of American football from Memphis, Tennessee
Players of American football from Maryland
Sportspeople from Memphis, Tennessee
Sportspeople from Montgomery County, Maryland
Tennessee Titans coaches
Washington Redskins coaches
Atlanta Falcons head coaches
Coaches of American football from Tennessee
Coaches of American football from Maryland